Giovanni Vitrotti (1874–1966) was an Italian cinematographer and film director who worked prolifically in Italian films from the silent era onwards. He made films in a number of other countries like Germany, Russia and Poland.

Selected filmography
Cinematographer
 The Last Days of Pompeii (1908)
 The Homecoming of Odysseus (1922)
 The Ravine of Death (1923)
 The Maharaja's Victory (1923)
 Quo Vadis? (1924)
 The Man on the Comet (1925)
 Frisian Blood (1925)
 Ship in Distress (1925)
 Hunted People (1926)
 Lives in Danger (1926)
 The Priest from Kirchfeld (1926)
 The Woman from the Folies Bergères (1927)
 Behind the Altar (1927)
 Forbidden Love (1927)
 The Merry Farmer (1927)
 The Last Performance of the Circus Wolfson (1928)
 Vienna, City of My Dreams (1928)
 Villa Falconieri (1928)
 Folly of Love (1928)
 A Girl with Temperament (1928)
 The Sinner (1928)
 Leontine's Husbands (1928)
 The Third Confession (1929)
 I Lost My Heart on a Bus (1929)
 Two People (1930)
 Mountains on Fire (1931)
 When the Soldiers (1931)
 A Storm Over Zakopane (1931)
 Zaganella and the Cavalier (1932)
 The Gift of the Morning (1932)
 Three Lucky Fools (1933)
 Villafranca (1934)
 The Four Musketeers (1936)
 The Countess of Parma (1936)
 Forbidden Music (1942)
 The Son of the Red Corsair (1943)
 Dagli Appennini alle Ande (1943)
 Buffalo Bill in Rome (1949)
 Against the Law (1950)

Bibliography
 Bertellini, Giorgio. Italy in Early American Cinema: Race, Landscape, and the Picturesque. Indiana University Press, 2010.

External links

1874 births
1966 deaths
Italian cinematographers
Film people from Turin